Below The Belt is the fifth studio album by Canadian hard rock band Danko Jones. It was released on May 11, 2010 in Canada and May 18 in the US.

Track listing 
 "I Think Bad Thoughts" - 3:31
 "Active Volcanoes" - 3:35
 "Tonight Is Fine" - 4:20
 "Magic Snake" - 3:19
 "Had Enough" - 3:42
 "(I Can't Handle) Moderation" - 3:03
 "Full of Regret" - 3:57
 "The Sore Loser" - 2:59
 "Like Dynamite" - 3:14
 "Apology Accepted" - 3:29
 "I Wanna Break Up With You" - 4:55
 "Guest List Blues" (Digipak and iTunes bonus track) - 3:20
 "Rock N Roll Proletariat" (Digipak and iTunes bonus track) - 3:37
 "The Kids Don't Want to Rock" (iTunes bonus track) - 3:27

Charts

Singles

Liner notes 
Produced and mixed by Matt DeMatteo.
Recorded at the Rogue Music Lab in Toronto. 
Assistant engineer: James Paul.
Additional vocals recorded at Phase One in Toronto. 
Mixed at Record High Studios in Montreal. 
Mastered by Brian Gardner at Bernie Grundman in LA. 
Live sound engineer: Corey Shields 
Cover model: Riley Steele

References 

2010 albums
Danko Jones albums
Aquarius Records (Canada) albums
Bad Taste Records albums